Sun City is an unincorporated community in Hillsborough County, Florida, United States. Sun City has a post office with ZIP code 33586.

Sun City was built in 1925 and originally promoted as "Florida's Moving Picture City", with streets named after notable film actors (ex. Blythe, Chaplin, Petrova) and a $300,000 movie studio. However, the housing bubble burst, and the studio was demolished in 1932.

References

Unincorporated communities in Hillsborough County, Florida
Unincorporated communities in Florida

Planned communities in Florida